Trillville is an American hip hop group formed in 1997. Its founding members are Donnell Don P Prince, Dirty Mouth (born Jamal Glaze), and LA (formerly Lil LA and Lil Atlanta; born Lawrence Edwards). Dirty Mouth left the group in 2007 to pursue a solo career and returned in 2011.

Biography
The three members of Trillville met as high school students in Atlanta. Glaze led the snare drums in the school's marching band, Don P wrote rhymes and produced beats on his keyboard, and Edwards was an aspiring promoter. They named their group "Trillville" combining the words "truth" and "real", with " Prince ", Glaze "Dirty Mouth", and Edwards "Lil Atlanta" (later "Lil LA" and "LA").

Lil Jon discovered Trillville at a sold-out show and signed the group to BME Recordings. Trillville debuted in 2003 with the single "Neva Eva", which peaked at #77 on the Billboard Hot 100 and #28 on the Hot R&B/Hip-Hop Songs charts in 2004. Collaborating with Lil Scrappy, Trillville came out with debut album The King of Crunk & BME Recordings Present: Trillville & Lil Scrappy in 2004. It featured the single "Some Cut", which peaked at #14 on the Billboard Hot 100 in 2005. Vibe described Trillville & Lil Scrappy as a crunk album and quoted Don P: "Our music is about whatever will make people move those [elbows] and be free about whatever they do."

Dirty Mouth left Trillville in 2007 to pursue a solo career, and Trillville left BME in January 2008. Trillville's second album Straight Up. No Chaser came out in 2008 released under the Swag Up label. With Dirty Mouth returning, Trillville released third album 3 Da' Hard Way in 2011., Recently Trillville has released their new group album “Dat Drip” on September 7, 2018.

Albums

Mixtapes

Singles

Music videos
(2004) "Neva Eva"
(2004) "Get Some Crunk In Yo System"
(2004) "Some Cut"
(2005) "Nothing Less"
(2005) "Watch Me Do This"

References

External links
Trillville official website (archived from 2005)

African-American musical groups
American crunk groups
Musical groups from Georgia (U.S. state)
Rappers from Atlanta
Southern hip hop groups